Anandavally C. R. (14 January 1952  5 April 2019) was an Indian actress and dubbing artist, who predominantly worked in the Malayalam film industry.

Early life
Anandavally was born into an agricultural family at Veliyam, State of Travancore-Cochin to Tamilian parents. She did her schooling in "Kaiyela School" - Veliyam, where she began acting in school plays and later started Kadhaprasangam (story-telling performance).

Career

Drama artist
Anandavally used to sing for dramas even while a teenager. But unexpectedly, her acting skills were put to test in front of a large audience during the drama "Chithalu Kayariya Bhoomi" in 1969. Then she started performing in several dramas of KPAC, Kalidasa Kalakendram, Deshabhimani Theaters-Attingal, Kerala Theaters-Kottayam and Kayamkulam Peoples Theaters.

Radio
She also worked as an announcer in the All India Radio.

Film actress

Anandavally entered the film industry through the film "Kadu" and went on to act in below given films. She became interested in pursuing a career in the entertainment industry following a minor role in various Malayalam films, where she remained a regular until she decided to pursue a dubbing artist career.

Dubbing artist
In 1973, she debuted as a dubbing artist and gave sound for actress Rajasri in the film Devi Kanyakumari. Manjil Virinja Pookkal Malayalam film dubbed for Poornima Jayaram was the break through. Thereafter, Anandavally did not look back. She has dubbed for numerous Malayalam films. She gave her voice for several leading heroines, the list as Geetha, Sumalatha, Madhavi, Menaka, Ambika, Urvasi, Jayapradha, Karthika, Parvathy, Gautami, Suhasini, Sobhana, Sukanya, Saritha, Silksmitha, Suchitra, Sarada, Bharathi, Bhanupriya, Rekha, Revathi, Radha, Raadhika, Renjini, Mohini, Nanditha Bose, Vinayaprasad, Kanaka, Khushbu, Unni Mary, Santhikrishna and so on. She won a Kerala State Award for the Malayalam film Aadhaaram dubbed for actress Geetha.

Filmography

Actress

Dubbing artist

Awards

Kerala State Film Awards
 1992 – Best Dubbing Artist:  – Aadhaaram

Kerala State Television Awards
 2015 - Best Dubbing Artist(s)- Male/Female Voice  - Eeshwaran Sakshiyayii

Kerala Film Critics Awards
1997 - Chalachitra Prathibha
2007 - Best Narrator 
Kerala State Award For Drama

1978 -  Enikku Maranamilla

References

External links

 
 
 https://www.facebook.com/anandavally.cr
 http://www.deshabhimani.com/periodicalContent1.php?id=558
 http://newindianexpress.com/cities/thiruvananthapuram/article267565.ece
 https://web.archive.org/web/20160304045904/http://en.msidb.org/displayProfile.php?category=actors&artist=Anandavalli&limit=13
 http://mathrubhuminews.in/ee/Programs/Episode/5026/their-voice-enlivens-characters-avar-kandumuttumbol-episode-53/E 

1952 births
Indian voice actresses
Indian film actresses
20th-century Indian actresses
Actresses from Kollam
Actresses in Malayalam cinema
Actresses in Malayalam television
21st-century Indian actresses
2019 deaths